Joseph Samuel Martin  (January 1, 1876 – May 25, 1964) was an outfielder who played in Major League Baseball.

External links

1876 births
1964 deaths
Major League Baseball outfielders
Major League Baseball infielders
Washington Senators (1901–1960) players
St. Louis Browns players
Baseball players from Pennsylvania
Danbury Hatters players
New Bedford Whalers (baseball) players
Columbus Senators players
Bridgeport Orators players
New Haven Blues players
Harrisburg Senators players
Johnstown Johnnies players
Altoona Mountaineers players
Trenton Tigers players
Wilmington Peaches players